Daniël D'Hondt (born 21 September 1961) is a Belgian retired professional goalkeeper who ended his career in 2001.

Playing career
D'Hondt spent the most of his career in Lokeren. In summer 2000, he joined NAC Breda.

Later he moved abroad and joined Dinamo Tbilisi as well, becoming only third player from outside the former Soviet Union to play in the Georgian Premier League after Carlos Alberto Pinha da Rocha and Uchechukwu Uwakwe.

Coaching career
After D'Hondt became coach and managed VW Hamme in 2009.

References

External links 
 Daniël D'Hondt Interview
 
 
 
 

Belgian footballers
Belgian expatriate footballers
1961 births
Living people
Association football goalkeepers
FC Dinamo Tbilisi players
K.S.C. Lokeren Oost-Vlaanderen players
Belgian Pro League players
People from Dendermonde
Sportkring Sint-Niklaas players
Footballers from East Flanders